Leif Dybvad Sørensen (born 25 November 1942) is a Danish former footballer who played as a forward or midfielder. He made 15 appearances for the Denmark national team from 1964 to 1969.

References

1942 births
Living people
Sportspeople from Frederiksberg
Danish men's footballers
Association football forwards
Association football midfielders
Denmark international footballers
Vejle Boldklub players
Hvidovre IF players